Anna Rogers (born 21 March 1998) is an American tennis player.

Rogers has a career-high singles ranking by the WTA of 561, achieved on 13 February 2023. She also has a career-high WTA doubles ranking of 144, achieved on 16 January 2023.

Rogers won her first major ITF title at the 2022 Caldas da Rainha Ladies Open, in the doubles draw, partnering Adriana Reami.

Rogers played college tennis at North Carolina State University (NC State).

ITF finals

Singles: 1 (title)

Doubles: 12 (9 titles, 2 runner-ups, 1 not played)

Notes

References

External links

1998 births
Living people
American female tennis players
Sportspeople from Stamford, Connecticut
NC State Wolfpack women's tennis players
Tennis people from Connecticut